Bank Norwegian, en filial av Nordax Bank AB (publ) is a Norwegian digital bank which provides loans, credit cards and savings accounts to consumers. The company was founded in November 2007 and is headquartered at Fornebu, Norway and have customers in Norway, Sweden, Denmark, Finland, Germany and Spain. Bank Norwegian cooperates with Norwegian Air Shuttle ASA on their loyalty program available in selected markets. in 2021, the bank has more than 1,7 million customers in total.

History 
In May 2007, Norwegian announced that they planned to enter the banking sector, with Erik Jensen as CEO of the new company, Bank Norwegian. Mr. Jensen was previously CEO of yA Bank og Forsikring AS (yA Bank and Insurance). In September 2007, Bank Norwegian received a commercial bank operating license from the Norwegian Ministry of Finance. In October 2007 Norwegian announced that they planned to start a combined credit and bonus card program (Norwegian Reward) with up to 20% bonus for international flights and 1% of the purchase price on all credit purchases. The bank began providing services in Sweden in May 2013 and in Denmark and Finland in December 2015. On 19 August 2019, Bank Norwegian's parent company Bank Norwegian ASA (Previously Norwegian Finans Holding ASA) announced that Norwegian Air Shuttle had sold its entire shareholding in the company to Cidron Xingu Limited. Bank Norwegian was enlisted on the Oslo Stock Exchange from 17th of June 2016.

In November 2021, Nordax Bank AB completed acquisition of Bank Norwegian after a bidding process, and the company was delisted from Oslo Stock Exchange on 15th of November 2021. On November 30th, the merger between the two banks was completed.

References

External links 
 Official website Norway
 Norwegian reward
 Norwegian Air Shuttle
 Official website Sweden
 Official website Finland
 Norwegian Credit Card Finland
 Official website Denmark

Banks of Norway
Banks established in 2007
Norwegian Air Shuttle
2007 establishments in Norway
Financial services companies of Norway
Multinational companies headquartered in Norway